The Ruger-5.7 is a semi-automatic pistol introduced in December 2019 by Sturm, Ruger & Co.  It is the first traditionally-styled semi-automatic pistol to be chambered for the 5.7×28mm cartridge since the introduction of the Excel Arms MP-57 in 2012.

See also 
 FN Five-seven – semi-automatic pistol chambered for the 5.7×28mm cartridge 
  Fort mod. 28 – semi-automatic pistol chambered for the 5.7×28mm cartridge
 Heckler & Koch UCP – competing 4.6×30mm PDW-caliber pistol project briefly developed by Heckler & Koch in Germany
 PSA 5.7 Rock – Semi-automatic pistol chambered for the 5.7×28mm cartridge
 Smith & Wesson M&P 5.7  – Semi-automatic pistol chambered for the 5.7×28mm cartridge

References

External links
 Ruger 57 by Hickok45 via YouTube
 Ruger-57 at Ruger

5.7×28mm firearms
Ruger semi-automatic pistols
Semi-automatic pistols of the United States
Weapons and ammunition introduced in 2019